The Forth Road Bridge is a suspension bridge in east central Scotland. The bridge opened in 1964 and at the time was the longest suspension bridge in the world outside the United States. The bridge spans the Firth of Forth, connecting Edinburgh, at South Queensferry, to Fife, at North Queensferry. It replaced a centuries-old ferry service to carry vehicular traffic, cyclists and pedestrians across the Forth; railway crossings are made by the nearby Forth Bridge, opened in 1890.

The Scottish Parliament voted to scrap tolls on the bridge from February 2008. The adjacent Queensferry Crossing was opened in August 2017 to carry the M90 motorway across the Firth of Forth, replacing the Forth Road Bridge which had exceeded its design capacity. At its peak, the Forth Road Bridge carried 65,000 vehicles per day.

The Forth Road Bridge was subsequently closed for repairs and refurbishment. It reopened in February 2018, now redesignated as a dedicated Public Transport Corridor, with access to motor vehicles other than buses and taxis restricted; pedestrians and cyclists are still permitted to use the bridge. Starting in or before 2021, Stagecoach Fife will be carrying out the first driverless bus trial to carry passengers in the United Kingdom along a park-and-ride route which includes the Forth Road Bridge as its main section.

History
The first crossing at the site of the bridge was established in the 11th century by Margaret, queen consort of King Malcolm III, who founded a ferry service to transport religious pilgrims from Edinburgh to Dunfermline Abbey and St Andrews. Its creation gave rise to the port towns of Queensferry and North Queensferry, which remain to this day; the passenger ferry service continued without interruption for over 800 years. There were proposals as early as the 1740s for a road crossing at the site, although its viability was only considered after the Forth Bridge was built in 1890.

The importance of the crossing for vehicular traffic was underpinned when the Great Britain road numbering scheme was drawn up in the 1920s. The planners wished the arterial A9 road to be routed across the Forth here, although the unwillingness to have a ferry crossing as part of this route led to the A90 number being assigned instead.

There was more lobbying for a road crossing in the 1920s and 1930s, when the only vehicle crossing was a single passenger and vehicle ferry. Sir William Denny championed the expansion of that service in the 1930s, providing and operating on behalf of the London and North Eastern Railway two additional ferries to supplement the nearby railway bridge. Due to their success, two more ferry boats were added in the 1940s and 1950s, by which time the ferries were making 40,000 crossings annually, carrying 1.5 million passengers and 800,000 vehicles.

Design
The authorities on both sides investigated in 1955, and drew up an alternative scheme for a tunnel beneath the estuary. This was known as the Maunsell Scheme, and was projected to run somewhat closer to the rail bridge than the present road bridge. The scheme was abandoned as too ambitious, and a bridge was built instead.

Construction

The final construction plan was accepted in February 1958 and work began that September. Mott, Hay and Anderson and Freeman Fox & Partners carried out the design work and a joint venture of Sir William Arrol & Co., Cleveland Bridge & Engineering Company and Dorman Long constructed the bridge at a cost of £15.1 million. The resident design engineer was John Alexander King Hamilton FRSE (1900–1982).

It was the longest steel suspension bridge in Europe. Reed & Mallik built the approach viaducts.

Twenty-four individual bridges were built for the approach roads. The  southern approach road of the A90 began at Cramond Bridge, over the River Almond on the western outskirts of Edinburgh, near Craigiehall. There were two-level interchanges built at Burnshot, Dolphington (B924) and the Echline junction (A904 and B800). At Dalmeny there was a bridge over the railway. The southern approach roads were built by A.M. Carmichael Ltd. The  northern approach road had three two-level junctions at Ferry Toll (for the B980), Admiralty (for Rosyth Dockyard via the A985, and Inverkeithing via the A921) and at Mastertown/Masterton (for what would be the fledgling M90 southern terminus). The Masterton junction was an octopus junction, a variation of a clover-leaf junction, with six bridges and a 600 ft viaduct. There were fifteen bridges built for this approach road. The northern approach road terminated as the A823(M) at a roundabout with the A823 south of Dunfermline, next to Rosyth railway station. The northern approach roads were built by Whatlings Ltd of Glasgow, later bought by Alfred McAlpine.

Seven people died during construction before the bridge was opened by Queen Elizabeth II and the Duke of Edinburgh on 4 September 1964. The ferry service was discontinued as of that date.

Operation
The bridge's management was delegated to the FRBJB, and remained so until 2002 when its operation was transferred to a new body with a wider remit, the Forth Estuary Transport Authority.

On 1 December 2010, the bridge was closed for the first time due to heavy snow. After several accidents meant snowploughs were unable to clear the carriageways, the bridge was closed in both directions at 6.40 a.m. and remained closed for several hours.

As part of celebrations of the 50th anniversary of the bridge's operation, artist Kate Downie was commissioned to create a print of the bridge and hold an exhibition of works portraying it.

On 1 June 2015, Amey took over the maintenance and operating of the bridge on behalf of Transport Scotland from the Forth Estuary Transport Authority and are now called the Forth Bridges Unit.

Structural issues

Forth Estuary Transport Authority (FETA) began to be concerned over the structural wear of the bridge in the early years of the 21st century. The planned theoretical capacity for the bridge (30,000 vehicles per day in each direction) was routinely exceeded as traffic levels outstripped predictions. The Scottish Government stated in 2006 that 60,000 vehicles travelled on more than half the days in a year. This raised concerns about the lifespan of the bridge, originally planned at 120 years.

In 2003, an inspection programme was launched (costing £1.2 million) to assess the condition of the main suspension cables after corrosion was discovered in a number of older bridges in the United States of a similar design and size. The study was completed two years later and reported that the main cables had suffered an 8%–10% loss of strength. This weakening was projected to accelerate, with traffic restrictions to limit loading required in 2014 in the worst-case scenario, followed by full closure by 2020.

An acoustic monitoring system was commissioned in August 2006, using listening devices to monitor any further strands snapping and pinpoint their location within the main cables. In January 2006, the Scottish Executive completed a third-party audit on the bridge which concluded that FETA had performed the initial internal inspection and cable strength calculation in accordance with accepted practice. The report suggested that traffic restrictions could be required by 2013.

Several actions were taken to increase the bridge's lifespan. These included a dehumidification programme that slowed the rate of corrosion in the main cables by keeping air in the voids between the main cables' strands below 40% humidity. Engineering consultants Faber Maunsell began work on the project in 2006; it took two and a half years to complete at a cost of £7.8 million. As part of the works, some of the corroded cable strands were spliced.

The southbound carriageway of the bridge was closed on 1 December 2015, with all traffic using a single lane each way on the northbound carriageway after steelwork defects had been discovered during routine inspections, and traffic was restricted to 7.5 tonnes or less (public service vehicles excepted). On 4 December, the bridge was fully closed when further structural faults were found. It was initially not expected to reopen until January 2016, and Transport Scotland began work to lay on extra trains and buses and considered whether to reintroduce a ferry service to mitigate the impact on travellers.

On 23 December, the bridge was reopened for all traffic except heavy goods vehicles (HGVs). On 4 February, it was announced this had been pushed back to March, due to further problems with the truss end link pins in the southern towers, which required additional remedial work. However, a limited number of HGVs were allowed to cross, in a northbound direction only, between 11 pm and 4 am each night. On 20 February 2016, the bridge was fully reopened.

2016 public inquiry
On 20 January 2016, the Scottish Parliament began an inquiry led by the Infrastructure and Capital Investment Committee (ICI) to determine the circumstances that led to the discovery of a cracked truss in the bridge's undercarriage. Evidence was heard from: FETA, Transport Minister Derek Mackay, engineers and officials from Amey along with a number of other experts and key personnel.

On the first day, Richard Hornby, of engineering consulting firm Arup, stated that the truss end in question had been inspected 23 times since 2001, and no fault had been found. It was revealed that a pin had seized up, which caused the truss end to crack, and it was only the quality of the steel which had stopped its cracking appearing earlier. Hornby also made clear that even if the seized pin had been picked up earlier, it was "virtually impossible" to lubricate the bearing. Several witnesses defended a decision by previous operator FETA not to proceed with a £15 million truss end link replacement project in 2010. This was disputed by Barry Colford, former chief engineer and bridgemaster at FETA. Lesley Hinds, FETA's former convener, pointed out that the bridge budget had been cut by 58% in 2011, while senior staff at FETA had "deep concerns" about the transfer of bridge management to a private company.

New crossings and change of use

The strategic transport importance of the road bridge and the threat of closure by 2020 if major structural work were not undertaken led to fears of serious economic consequences. Increasing traffic levels across the Firth of Forth had also led to the construction of the Clackmannanshire Bridge adjacent to the existing Kincardine Bridge. This bridge opened in November 2008.

Proposals for a second road crossing at Queensferry had been made in the 1990s, but were shelved, despite preliminary work on route selection. Following the discovery of potentially serious structural issues with the Forth Road Bridge in 2005 the proposals were revisited and plans advanced. The decision to proceed with a replacement bridge was taken at the end of 2007, and it was announced the following year that the existing bridge would be retained as a public transport link. The Forth Crossing Act received Royal Assent in January 2011, and the new bridge was opened in late 2017.

On 1 February 2018, the Forth Road Bridge became a Public Transport Corridor, with all approach roads in full operation. The bridge was closed between September and mid October 2017 for roadworks before partially reopening for public buses.

On 22 November 2018, it was announced that £4.35 million of funding had been secured for the United Kingdom's first passenger-carrying driverless bus trial, planned to take place across the Forth Road Bridge public transport corridor by 2021. Five brand new autonomous 42-seater Alexander Dennis Enviro200 MMC single-decker buses, with autonomous control modifications supplied by Fusion Processing, will be operated by Stagecoach Fife on a  park-and-ride route from the north side of Forth across the bridge to Edinburgh Park station. For operational reasons and to comply with UK legislation, a driver will still be present in the cab, but they will not operate the vehicle other than in exceptional circumstances.

As of December 2020, work was underway that would allow the Forth Road Bridge to become an emergency diversion route for private transport. The Queensferry Crossing has proofing that makes it less vulnerable to high winds than the Forth Road Bridge, but it was closed for the first time in February 2020 due to accumulations of ice on its towers.

Statistics
It was the longest suspension bridge span outside the United States and the fourth-longest span in the world at the time of its construction. The bridge is made of 39,000 tonnes of steel and 115,000 cubic metres of concrete. There is a dual carriageway road with two lanes in each direction, and cycle/footpaths on each side.

The bridge carried around 2.5 million vehicles in its first year, increasing to around 21.4 million vehicles in 2008. The bridge carried its 250 millionth vehicle in 2002.

It was awarded Historic Scotland's Category A listed structure status in 2001.

Tolls
On 11 February 2008 tolls were abolished on the bridge.

Initially, it was suggested that tolls would cease once the original cost of construction (plus accrued interest) was repaid. This was achieved in 1993, and it was planned that tolls would not be levied after May 1995. Instead, legislation enabling the continued levying of tolls was renewed by Parliament (originally that of the UK but now the Scottish Parliament) in 1998, 2003 and 2006.

Originally, a toll was paid for each direction of travel, with sets of toll booths on both carriageways. In 1997, the northbound toll was doubled (from 40p to 80p) and the southbound toll abolished on the presumption that almost all traffic makes a return journey across the bridge, and that the removal of the southbound toll would result in a reduction of congestion without reducing revenue.

FETA said the continued charging of tolls was necessary to fund maintenance and improvement works. These included the construction of defences around the submerged piers forming the bases of the main towers to guard against collisions. The main towers were also strengthened with internal steel columns (the original tower structure was hollow) and had hydraulic rams jack up these sections to transfer a portion of the load to the new steelwork. Also, the vertical cables suspending the deck had their bolts replaced after a detected failure. A new paint system required development for the bridge (the original was phased out due to environmental concerns).

Variable tolling proposals
In late 2005, FETA's committee approved a proposed revamp of the tolls. The minimum toll would stay at £1, but higher tolls would be charged at some times of day, with a maximum of £4 during evening rush hours. All tolls would be halved for cars with more than one occupant, as an incentive to drivers to share cars and make fewer journeys. According to FETA's chairman Lawrence Marshall, the system would provide the most efficiency; he said that 80% of peak-time journeys are made by single-occupant vehicles. The proposal, passed with the chairman's casting vote after the committee was deadlocked, was referred to the Scottish Executive in December 2005, and implementation planned for October 2007 subject to approval by transport minister Tavish Scott. Environmental groups welcomed the proposal, but local politicians condemned it as simply a means of raising capital. At the same time, Fife councillors counter-proposed the complete removal of tolls.

The Scottish Parliament debated the proposals in January 2006, and the affair became a major political issue after Westminster Member of Parliament (MP) Gordon Brown and Alistair Darling (Chancellor of the Exchequer and Secretary of State for Scotland respectively) were seen to describe the variable tolling plan as "dead in the water". Scottish First Minister Jack McConnell insisted his Labour Party colleagues were misquoted, and refused to rule out the plan, receiving criticism from the opposition Scottish National Party.

There was a by-election on 9 February 2006 for the Westminster constituency in which the north end of the bridge is situated. It was contested (in addition to the major political parties in Scotland) by an Abolish Forth Bridge Tolls Party. Liberal Democrat candidate Willie Rennie won the election, overturning a large Labour majority on a 16% swing. Afterwards, media speculated that the Executive had turned against the proposals, and Tavish Scott eventually confirmed their rejection and the retention of the existing toll structure on 1 March 2006. FETA condemned the decision, while local opposition MSPs charged the minister that his tolling review short-changed Fifers as tolls were axed on the Erskine Bridge, leaving tolls on only the Forth and Tay Road Bridges.

Abolition
When an SNP minority government was formed after the Scottish parliamentary election of May 2007, a new debate on the abolition of tolls was opened by Transport Minister Stewart Stevenson on 31 May 2007, and the abolition was agreed by a large majority. Annual toll income at that point totalled £16 million.

The Abolition of Bridge Tolls (Scotland) Bill was introduced in the Scottish Parliament on 3 September 2007, passed on 20 December 2007, and received royal assent on 24 January 2008. The tolls were removed on 11 February 2008 at 00:01 GMT. The abolition of the tolls was enacted immediately after a major reconstruction of the northbound toll plaza was completed.

Suicides 
In 2011, it was stated that around 800 people had fallen to their deaths since the bridge had opened. A report in 2000 stated that prior to then, four people had survived falling from the bridge.

See also

DoCoMoMo Key Scottish Monuments
List of Category A listed buildings in Edinburgh
List of Category A listed buildings in Fife
 List of bridges in Scotland
 List of longest suspension bridge spans
List of post-war Category A listed buildings in Scotland
Prospect 100 best modern Scottish buildings

Notes

References

External links

 Official website
 Forth Estuary Transport Authority
 Bridges Visitor Centre Trust – Home Page

1964 establishments in Scotland
Bridges completed in 1964
Bridges in Fife
Former toll bridges in Scotland
Listed bridges in Scotland
Category A listed buildings in Edinburgh
Category A listed buildings in Fife
Road bridges in Scotland
Suspension bridges in the United Kingdom
Transport in Edinburgh
Bridges in Edinburgh
Firth of Forth
South Queensferry